Bordin is a surname. Notable people with the surname include:

Alessandro Bordin (born 1998), Italian footballer
Gelindo Bordin, Italian former athlete
Mike Bordin, American drummer
Roberto Bordin, Italian former footballer
Thiago Bordin, Brazilian ballet dancer

See also
Bordini